Jodi Tymeson (born June 27, 1955) is a former Iowa State Representative from the 77th and 73rd Districts. She served in the Iowa House of Representatives since 2001, representing the 77th District until it was redrawn in 2003 and representing the 73rd District until 2011.  She received her BA from the University of Northern Iowa and her MPA from Drake University.

During her last term in the Iowa House, Tymeson served on several committees, the Education, Ethics, and Labor committees.  She also served on the Agriculture and Natural Resources Appropriations Subcommittee.  Also during her last term, she served as the ranking member of the Administration and Rules committee until November 2009 and as a member of the Veterans Affairs committee until October 2009.

Electoral history
*incumbent

References

External links

 Representative Jodi Tymeson official Iowa General Assembly site
 
Profile at Iowa House Republicans

1955 births
Living people
People from Boone, Iowa
Republican Party members of the Iowa House of Representatives
Women state legislators in Iowa
University of Northern Iowa alumni
Drake University alumni
People from Winterset, Iowa
21st-century American women